Events in the year 1968 in Norway.

Incumbents
 Monarch – Olav V
 Prime Minister – Per Borten (Centre Party)

Events
 19 February – Avalanches occur in Bondalen which kill four people.
 19 March – The Palace announces that Crown Prince Harald has engaged to Sonja Haraldsen.
 29 August – Crown Prince Harald married Sonja Haraldsen in the Oslo Cathedral.
 13 September – Norwegian whaling in the Southern Hemisphere ceases after the last whaling company officially announces it would not send any more whaling expeditions.
 9 October – the first commercial discovery of petroleum deposit on the Norwegian continental shelf was confirmed.
 The Norwegian Sami Association was founded

Popular culture

Sports

Music

Film

Literature
The Norwegian Writers' Center (Norsk forfattersentrum) is established.
Finn Alnæs, novelist, is awarded the Norwegian Booksellers' Prize and the Norwegian Critics Prize for Literature for the novel Gemini.
Ebba Haslund, novelist, is awarded the Riksmål Society Literature Prize for Syndebukkens krets.

Notable births
 

15 January – Grete Wold, politician.
16 January – Mikkel Gaup, actor.
28 January – Tore Torvbråten, curler.
31 January – May-Helen Molvær Grimstad, politician
6 February – Monica Mæland, politician
18 February – Frank Edvard Sve, politician.
1 March – Lars Mytting, writer.
19 March – Julie Christiansen, politician
22 March – Euronymous, black metal guitarist (died 1993)
7 April – Stein Torleif Bjella, singer and songwriter.
20 May – Vibeke Fürst Haugen, media executive.
27 June – Rikke Lind, politician
2 July – Fridtjov Såheim, actor.
5 August – Frode Jacobsen, politician.
8 August – Else Ragni Yttredal, speed skater.
13 August – Ketil Kjenseth, politician.
21 August – Hanne Tømta, theatre instructor and theatre director.
25 August – Rune Erland, handball player.
24 September – Beate Heieren Hundhammer, politician
16 October – Vibeke Johnsen, handball player.
1 November – Astrid Danielsen, cyclist.
6 December – Karl Ove Knausgård, author
12 December – Anita Valen, cyclist.

Notable deaths

18 January – Trygve Knudsen, philologist, linguist and lexicographer (born 1897).
21 January – Jacob Gundersen, freestyle wrestler and Olympic silver medallist (born 1875).
11 February
 Jørgen Wilhelm Rudolph, businessperson (born 1881)
 Herman Willoch, painter (born 1892).
29 February – Tore Ørjasæter, poet (born 1886).
2 March – Odd Hølaas, journalist and writer (born 1898).
12 March – Einar Kristian Haugen, politician (born 1905)
19 March – Aagot Didriksen, actress (born 1874).
25 March – Arnulf Øverland, author (born 1889).
31 March – Christen Wiese, sailor and Olympic gold medallist (born 1876)
15 April – Martin Stenersen, sport shooter (born 1879)
25 April – Gunnar Andersen, international soccer player and ski jumper (born 1890)
27 April – Anton Olsen, rifle shooter and Olympic bronze medallist (born 1897)
11 May – Johan Andersen, politician (born 1902)
23 May – Georg Braathe, long-distance runner (born 1903)
24 May – Paal Olav Berg, politician and Minister (born 1873)
25 May – Kasper Idland, resistance member (born 1918)
1 June – Harald Eriksen, gymnast and Olympic gold medallist (born 1888)
3 June – John Bjørnstad, rowing coxswain (born 1888).
6 July – Johan Sæterhaug, boxer (born 1893)
16 July – Sigurd Pedersen, politician (born 1893)
25 July – Hallvard Sandnes, writer (born 1893).
6 August – Tore Foss, singer, actor and theatre director (born 1901).
13 August – Øystein Ore, mathematician (born 1899)
16 August – Paul Ingebretsen, politician (born 1904)
29 August – Arne Korsmo, architect (born 1900)
4 September – Engebret Skogen, rifle shooter and Olympic bronze medallist (born 1887)
24 September – Kjell Tellander, politician (born 1899)
3 October – Jens Martin Arctander Jenssen, politician (born 1885)
2 December – Arne Damm, publisher (born 1894).
15 December – Håkon Bryhn, sailor and Olympic gold medallist (born 1901)
20 December – Anders Endreson Skrondal, politician (born 1891)
30 December – Trygve Lie, politician, the first elected United Nations Secretary-General (born 1896)

Full date unknown
John Aae, politician (born 1890)

See also

References

External links